Hildur Odlaug Os (19 March 1913 – 4 July 2009) was a Norwegian civil servant and politician for the Labour Party.

She was born in Eid as a daughter of builder and timber merchant Anders Karlsen (1871–1940) and Astrid Langeland (1879–1932). She attended Fjordane Folk High School from 1929 to 1930, and took numerous classes through postal correspondence. She spent most of her career as chief administrator of social affairs in Eid, from 1968 to 1983. She also chaired the local Noregs Ungdomslag chapter from 1936 to 1938 and the gymnastics department of Eid IL from 1952 to 1955.

She also served as a deputy representative to the Parliament of Norway from Sogn og Fjordane during the terms 1961–1965, 1965–1969, 1969–1973 and 1973–1977. In total she met during 193 days of parliamentary session.

References

1913 births
2009 deaths
Labour Party (Norway) politicians
Deputy members of the Storting
Sogn og Fjordane politicians
Norwegian civil servants
Women members of the Storting
20th-century Norwegian women politicians
20th-century Norwegian politicians